Aaron Peck (born October 9, 1994) is an American former football wide receiver. He played college football at Fresno State as a wide receiver before transitioning to the tight end position. He signed with the Green Bay Packers as an undrafted free agent.

Professional career

Green Bay Packers
After going undrafted in the 2017 NFL Draft, Peck signed with the Green Bay Packers as an undrafted free agent on May 5, 2017. He was waived on September 2, 2017.

San Diego Fleet
On August 6, 2018, Peck signed with the San Diego Fleet of the Alliance of American Football. He failed to make the final roster.

Calgary Stampeders
Peck re-signed with the Calgary Stampeders on December 17, 2020. He retired from football on June 28, 2021.

References

External links
Fresno State Bulldogs bio

1994 births
Living people
Players of American football from Riverside, California
American football tight ends
Fresno State Bulldogs football players
Green Bay Packers players
San Diego Fleet players
Canadian football wide receivers
Calgary Stampeders players